Stefano Bollani (born 5 December 1972) is an Italian composer, pianist and singer, also active as a writer and a television presenter.

He has worked with such musicians as Gato Barbieri, Chick Corea, Bill Frisell, Sol Gabetta, Richard Galliano, Egberto Gismonti, Lee Konitz, Bobby McFerrin, Pat Metheny, Caetano Veloso, Phil Woods, Hector Zazou  and has recorded more than 15 albums with trumpeter Enrico Rava. Bollani has performed with several symphonic orchestras (Filarmonica della Scala, Orchestra dell'Accademia Nazionale di Santa Cecilia, Leipzig Gewandhaus Orchestra, Royal Concertgebouw Orchestra, Orchestre de Paris, Toronto Symphony Orchestra, among others) and with directors such as Riccardo Chailly, Daniel Harding, Kristjan Järvi, Zubin Mehta, Gianandrea Noseda and Antonio Pappano. He has also played with Italian pop-rock artists and has participated in and hosted TV and radio shows. Currently, he has published 49 albums alone (31 studio).

Biography

Early life 
Born in Milan to Roberto Bollani, from Lombardy, and a Venetian mother from Rovigo, Maddalena, he has a sister named Manuela born in Alba, Piedmont. He grew up in Florence where he began his studies in the Conservatorio Luigi Cherubini at the age of 6 and where he graduated in 1993 under the supervision of Maestro Antonio Caggiula. At 15 he had already started to perform professionally. After a short experience touring as a pop artist and after playing in the pop-rock band La Forma, since the mid-nineties he established himself in the jazz scene.

1990s 
A crucial event for Bollani's career was meeting Enrico Rava, who he started playing with in 1996. Together they have performed in hundreds of concerts and have recorded more than 15 albums, the first of which are Certi angoli segreti (1998), Rava Plays Rava and Shades of Chet (1999). Around these years Bollani also started playing with some of the most important Italian jazz artists: Paolo Fresu, Roberto Gatto and Enzo Pietropaoli. In 1998 he recorded his first album Gnòsi delle fànfole, based on poems by Fosco Maraini, with singer-songwriter Massimo Altomare. In the same year, he played for the first time with American saxophonist Lee Konitz in TenderLee for Chet, and won the prize for best new talent awarded by Italian magazine Musica Jazz. In 1999 two more albums came out: Mambo Italiano – recorded with one of his most trusted collaborators, double bass player Ares Tavolazzi – and L'orchestra del Titanic, recorded with the orchestra that gave the name to the album: Antonello Salis, Riccardo Onofri, Raffaello Pareti and Walter Paoli, besides Bollani himself. He also participated in Passatori, by the French accordionist Richard Galliano, with the Solisti dell'Orchestra della Toscana.

2000s 
Bollani's collaborations in the first years were not limited to jazz, but included works with Italian pop artists such as Elio, Irene Grandi, Marco Parente, Peppe Servillo, Bobo Rondelli, Banda Osiris, Bandabardò, Massimo Ranieri. In the meantime, the partnership with Enrico Rava kept flourishing and together they released Montréal Diary/B (2001),Tati (2005), The Third Man (2007) and New York Days (2009). Furthermore, Bollani featured in several albums and international tours where he played with such musicians as Gianni Basso, Gianluca Petrella, John Abercrombie, Jeff Ballard, Larry Grenadier, Paul Motian, Mark Turner, Phil Woods, Gato Barbieri and Pat Metheny. Two notable collaborations occurred in 2003: one with Russian singer Sainkho Namtchylak (Who Stole the Sky?), and one with Hector Zazou who invited Bollani to play alongside him in Strong Currents (other guests were Laurie Anderson, Jane Birkin and Ryuichi Sakamoto).

Between 2002 and 2006, Bollani recorded six albums for French Label Bleu. The series began with Les Fleurs bleues (2002), inspired by the novel by Raymond Queneu and recorded with Scott Colley and Clarence Penn, followed by Småt Småt (2003) highlighted by English magazine Mojo as one of the best albums of the year. In 2004 Concertone was released, the first album Bollani recorded with a symphonic orchestra – the Orchestra della Toscana directed by Paolo Silvestri – based on which choreographer Mauro Bigonzetti crafted a ballet for the Stuttgart Ballet. In the same year Bollani also won the New Star Award, conferred for the first time to a non-US musician by Japanese magazine Swing Journal. The last of the four albums was released in 2006, titled I visionari and recorded with the homonym band formed by Mirko Guerrini, Nico Gori, Ferruccio Spinetti and Cristiano Calcagnile, with special features by Mark Feldman, Paolo Fresu and Petra Magoni (at the time his wife).

During these same years, Japanese label Venus Records released four albums by the “Stefano Bollani Trio” formed with Ares Tavolazzi on contrabass and Walter Paoli on drums: Black and Tan Fantasy (2002), Volare (2002), Falando de amor (2003), Ma l'amore no (2004) and I'm in the Mood for Love (2007). At the same time Bollani began an intense collaboration with contrabass player Jesper Bodilsen and drummer Morten Lund, with whom he formed the “Danish Trio”. In a three-year span, Stunt label released Mi ritorni in mente (2003), Close to You (2004, with Danish singer Katrine Madsen) and Gleda: Songs from Scandinavia (2005). Finally, in 2009, ECM published Stone in the Water.

In 2006, Piano Solo was released and the Italian magazine Musica Jazz awarded it the best album of the year and nominated Bollani for the best Italian musician of the year. The following year, Bollani tackled classical repertoire with the Filarmonica '900 of the Teatro Regio of Turin, directed by Jan Latham-Koenig, by recording the Concert champêtre, Les Animaux Modèles, and the Improvisations number 13 and 15 by Francis Poulenc. A few months later BollaniCarioca came out, recorded with important Brazilian artists. In 2007 he played a piano in a Rio de Janeiro favela: only Antônio Carlos Jobim had done this before. In the same year he won the Hans Koller European Jazz Prize as the best European musician of 2007 and was listed among the five most important musicians of the year by American website All About Jazz alongside Dave Brubeck, Ornette Coleman, Charles Mingus and Sonny Rollins.

Around this time, Bollani appeared again in the Italian pop music scene, but the most relevant collaboration was that started in 2009 with jazz pianist Chick Corea, with whom Bollani toured through various Italian cities showcasing a totally new duo performance. The live album Orvieto is based on these performances.

2010–present
On 15 July 2010, Bollani received an Honorary Doctorate of Music from Berklee College of Music. On September 14, the award was presented on the main stage of the Umbria Jazz Festival in Perugia, Italy by Berklee's former vice president of academic affairs, Larry Monroe. The same year Rhapsody in Blue – Concerto in F was released. The album includes three classical works by George Gershwin played by the Leipzig Gewandhaus Orchestra directed by Riccardo Chailly: Rhapsody in Blue (in the piano and jazz band version by Paul Whiteman), Piano Concerto in F, and Rialto Ripples. The album entered the pop charts ranking at number eight, making it the first ever classical music album in Italy to be included in the top ten. It also won the Platinum award after having sold seventy thousand copies.

In 2012, Bollani and Chailly played again with the Leipzig Gewandhaus Orchestra to record Sound of the 30s, which includes great classics from the Thirties: Piano Concerto in G major by Maurice Ravel, Tango by Igor Stravinsky, Tango Ballad (from The Threepenny Opera) and Surabaya Johnny (from the Happy End musical) by Kurt Weill, and A Thousand and One Nights by Victor de Sabata. The two played with the Orchestre de Paris, in Paris, and with the Filarmonica della Scala in Milan. The Milan concert was broadcast live in movie theaters of about 20 countries on April 21, 2012, and recorded on the Live at La Scala DVD (2013) that includes pieces by George Gershwin (Catfish Row, An American in Paris, Concerto in F, Rialto Ripples), by Scott Joplin (Maple Leaf Rag) and by Joseph Kosma (Autumn Leaves).

The numerous concerts with symphonic orchestras – directed by Daniel Harding, Kristian Järvi, Zubin Mehta, Gianandrea Noseda and Antonio Pappano among others – did not keep Bollani from recording various albums with other artists, such as Big Band!, with the Hamburg-based NDR Bigband directed by Norwegian saxophonist Geir Lysne (2011; Echo Jazz award 2013), Irene Grandi & Stefano Bollani (2012), O que será with Hamilton de Holanda (2013), Sheik Yer Zappa, a tribute to Frank Zappa's music (2014). Also in 2014, Bollani again recorded with the Danish Trio releasing Joy in Spite of Everything featuring Mark Turner and Bill Frisell, which was conferred the Best Album of the year award by Musica Jazz. On September 26, Bollani received another International award, namely the JTI Trier Jazz Award.

In 2015, Bollani recorded his first album as singer-songwriter Arivano gli alieni. The following year the new album Live from Mars was released and the project Napoli Trip begins: Bollani pays tribute to Neapolitan music accompanied by Daniele Sepe, Nico Gori, Manu Katché and Jan Bang, and alongside Arye Henriksen, Audun Klive and Hamilton de Holanda. Also in 2016, Bollani participated in Hamilton de Holanda's recording of Samba de chico and played with Chico Buarque in Vai trabalhar vagabundo. In 2017, he played at the Berliner Philharmonie with Jesper Bodilsen, Morten Lund, the French accordionist Vincent Peirani, and 14 members of the Berliner Philharmonic, paying homage to Italian composers such as Monteverdi, Leoncavallo, Puccini, Rossini, Rota, and Morricone. Directed and arranged by Geir Lysne, the concert became an album entitled Mediterraneo. In May 2018, Bollani released Que Bom, the first album of his own label, Alobar; made of new songs and entirely recorded in Rio de Janeiro, it features artists such as Caetano Veloso, João Bosco, Jaques Morelenbaum and Hamilton de Holanda. His latest albums include Piano Variations on Jesus Christ Superstar, a solo piano tribute to Jesus Christ Superstar released on the 50th anniversary of Andrew Lloyd Webber and Tim Rice's rock opera, and El Chakracanta, a live recording from Buenos Aires with the Orquesta Sin Fin, conducted by Exequiel Mantega.

Other projects 
Bollani wrote and hosted various Italian radio and TV shows: Il Dottor Djembè (Radio Rai 3, 2006-2012), Sostiene Bollani (Rai 3, 2001 and 2013), L'importante è avere un piano (Rai 1, 2016), and Via dei Matti nº0 (Rai 3, 2021-2022).

Bollani has also worked in theater, both as musician-actor and as composer. During the 2015/2016 season he co-wrote, co-directed and acted in La regina Dada with his partner Valentina Cenni.

Bollani has published several books, including the novel La sindrome di Brontolo (2006) and three works on the world of music: L'America di Renato Carosone (2004), Parliamo di musica (2013) and Il monello, il guru, l'alchimista e altre storie di musicisti (2015).

There is also a cartoon character based on Bollani, named Paperefano Bolletta, who appeared for the first time in the Italian version of the Disney magazine, Donald Duck pocket books (Topolino), on 22 September 2009.

Awards and honors

Main awards 
 1998: Best New Talent (awarded by Italian magazine Musica Jazz)
 2003: Premio Carosone
 2004: New Star Award (awarded by Japanese magazine Swing Journal)
 2006: Italian musician of the year (Musica Jazz)
 2006: Piano solo album of the year (Musica Jazz)
 2007: Hans Koller European Jazz Prize
 2007: Musician of the year (awarded by American website All About Jazz)
 2009: Paul Acket Award (awarded by North Sea Jazz Festival)
 2010: Capri Global Artist Award
 2010: Musician of the year (Musica Jazz)
 2011: Premio Fiorentini nel mondo
 2011: Los Angeles Excellence Award
 2012: Premio Milano per la musica
 2013: Echo Jazz award to Big Band! (album of the year for the category "Big Band")
 2014: JTI Trier Jazz Award
 2014: Joy in Spite of Everything album of the year (Musica Jazz)
 2019: Premio Monini Una finestra sui due mondi
 2021: Nastro d'Argento for Best Score – Carosello Carosone
 2021: Flaiano Prize for Best Cultural TV Program – Via dei Matti nº0
 2021: Tenco Award for Career Achievement
 2022: Soundtrack Stars Award – Critics' Award (79th Venice International Film Festival)

Honors 
 2008: Gonfalone d'argento (awarded by Tuscany Region)
 2010: Honorary Doctorate of Music from Berklee College of Music
 2016: Order of Merit of the Italian Republic – Class: Commendatore
 Honorary member of the Italian Institute of 'Pataphysics

Discography

As leader

Soundtracks

Gallery 
Bollani performing in 2013

References

External links
StefanoBollani.com, official site
label bleu

1972 births
Living people
Male jazz musicians
Italian jazz pianists
Italian male pianists
21st-century Italian musicians
21st-century Italian male musicians
21st-century pianists
ECM Records artists
Musicians from Milan
Label Bleu artists